Fatih Cengiz (born 26 September 1995) is a Turkish Greco-Roman wrestler. He was awarded one of the bronze medals in the 75 kg event at the 2017 World Wrestling Championships after Aleksandr Chekhirkin tested positive for doping.

He is a member of İstanbul Büyükşehir Belediyesi S.K.

Career 

In 2018, he won one of the bronze medals in the men's 77 kg event at the European U23 Wrestling Championship held in Istanbul, Turkey.

In 2019, he lost his bronze medal match against Viktor Nemeš in the 77 kg event at the European Wrestling Championships held in Bucharest, Romania. In March 2021, he competed at the European Qualification Tournament in Budapest, Hungary hoping to qualify for the 2020 Summer Olympics in Tokyo, Japan. He was eliminated in his first match by Aik Mnatsakanian of Bulgaria.

Major results

References

External links 
 

Living people
1995 births
Place of birth missing (living people)
Turkish male sport wrestlers
World Wrestling Championships medalists
20th-century Turkish people
21st-century Turkish people